Vayxır or Vaykhyr may refer to:
 Vayxır, Babek, Azerbaijan
 Vayxır, Sharur, Azerbaijan